Govinda Van Maele (born 1983) is a Luxembourgish film director of Sri Lankan‑Belgian origin.

Director and screenwriter of the drama film Gutland, it was selected as the Luxembourgish entry for the Best Foreign Language Film at the 91st Academy Awards.

Govinda Van Maele is the brother of Narayan Van Maele, who was a cinematographer at Gutland.

References

External links

 
 Making a film in Luxembourg forces you to face an aesthetic conundrum
 Govinda Van Maele at the luxfilmfest.lu
 

1983 births
Living people
Luxembourgian film directors
Luxembourgian screenwriters
Male screenwriters
Sri Lankan people of Belgian descent
Luxembourgian people of Sri Lankan descent